Shuja ul Mulk is a Pakistani politician who had been a member of the National Assembly of Pakistan from 2002 to 2007.

References

Living people
1968 births
Pashtun people
Pakistani MNAs 2002–2007
Jamiat Ulema-e-Islam (F) politicians
People from Mardan District